Langley Centre is an on-street bus exchange located in downtown Langley City, British Columbia, Canada. As part of the TransLink system, it serves the municipalities of Langley City and Langley Township with routes to Surrey, Maple Ridge, and White Rock, that provide connections to SkyTrain and the West Coast Express rail services for travel towards Vancouver.

Structure and location
The exchange opened on October 31, 1975, and is located on the curb lanes at the intersection of Glover Road and Logan Avenue in Langley City. It is not separated from regular traffic and can accommodate regular-length diesel buses and smaller community shuttles. Beside the exchange is the Rainbow Mall, a small shopping complex.

It is less than a kilometre from the main commercial centre of Langley City on Fraser Highway, and a few kilometres from Langley's largest shopping mall, Willowbrook Shopping Centre.

In 2022, an Expo Line extension from King George station to 203 Street in Langley City was approved with an estimated completion date of 2028. When completed, the new SkyTrain station at 203 Street and Fraser Highway will replace Langley Centre.

Routes
, the following routes serve Langley Centre exchange:

See also
List of bus routes in Metro Vancouver

References

External links

TransLink (British Columbia) bus stations
Langley, British Columbia (city)
1975 establishments in British Columbia